is a view point and a park just aside of the top of Maya-san in Kobe, Japan. It has one of the Three Major Night Views of Japan called ten million dollar night views.

Outline 

It starts with a walking path decorated with fluorescent material which is supposed to remind visitors of the Milky Way.

Because of its fabulous night view of the city lights spread out before, this place is even likened to "a hill (台) where one could scoop up (掬う) a handful of star (星)," hence the name "Kikuseidai (掬星台)".

Location 
Mayasancho, Nada-ku, Kobe, Hyōgo Prefecture

See also
 Three Major Night Views of Japan (in Japanese)
 Mayasancho (in Japanese)

Parks and gardens in Hyōgo Prefecture
Kobe